Matt Luke may refer to:
Matt Luke (American football), American football coach
Matt Luke (baseball), baseball player